Magalie Lépine-Blondeau (born August 18, 1982) is a Canadian actress and television host.

Biography 
Magalie Lépine-Blondeau studied theater at Cégep de Saint-Laurent, then at The National Theater School of Canada. After she obtained her degree, she made many appearances on television, cinema, and theater. She dubs characters in hundreds of films and series. She also lends her voice to Tamara Hope.

In theater, she regularly works with the director Serge Denoncourt. Under his direction, she has notably acted as Madame de Tourvel in Les Liaisons dangereuses and Roxane in Cyrano de Bergerac. She also participated in the creation of Christine, la reine-garçon, by Michel Marc Bouchard.

Since September 2015, she has hosted the show Partir autrement on TV5.

She achieved great success in 2016 in District 31 when she acted as the lieutenant detective, Nadine Legrand. However, her character died in a motorcycle accident in only the second season of the series.

On October 7, 2015, the site Hollywood PQ announced that she is in a relationship with the comedian Louis-José Houde. They separated in 2019. She remains very secretive about her relationships and does not appear in public with her partners.

Theater 

 2003 : Antiviol : The girl
 2004 : Orphée aux enfers : Eurydice
 2005 : Quelques États américains : Multiple Roles
 2005 : L'Amour médecin : Lisette
 2006 : Une année sans été : Mademoiselle Point
 2007 : Dom Juan : Mathurine
 2007 : Les Fourberies de Scapin : Hyacinte and musician
 2007–2008 : Comment j'ai appris à conduire : Greek and teenage choir
 2010–2011 : Il Campiello : Lucietta
 2011 : Ostiguy et fils : Louise
 2011–2012 : Ana : Ana
 2012 : Christine, la reine garçon : Ebba Spare
 2013 : Le Diable rouge : Marie Mancini
 2014 : Les Liaisons dangereuses : Mme de Tourvel
 2014 : Cyrano de Bergerac : Roxane
 2015 : Un show nommé Désir, d'après Un tramway nommé Désir de Tennessee Williams : Stella
 2019 : Électre : Électre
 2019 : La nuit où Laurier-Gaudreault s’est réveillé : Chantal

Filmography

Cinema 

 2005 : A Family Secret (Le Secret de ma mère) : Fleurette
 2006 : My Aunt Aline (Ma tante Aline) : Stéphanie
 2009 : Heartbeats (Les Amours imaginaires) : Unknown young woman
 2011 : The Bossé Empire (L'Empire Bo$$é) : Simone
 2011 : Laurence Anyways : Charlotte
 2013 : An Extraordinary Person (Quelqu'un d'extraordinaire) : Sarah
 2014 : An Eye for Beauty (Le Règne de la beauté) : Karine
 2014 : Love Project (Love Projet) : Louise
 2016 : 9 (9, le film) : Viviane
 2019 : A Brother's Love (La Femme de mon frère) : Annabelle Lajoie
 2019: Thanks for Everything (Merci pour tout)
 2019: Restless River (La rivière sans repos)

Television 

 2005 : Providence : Sabrina Major
 2005 : Smash 2 : Assistant of journalist
 2006–2007 : R-Force : Animator
 2007–2008 : Les Étoiles filantes : Annie Brière
 2008 : C.A. : Mylène
 2008–2009 : Soirée pyjama pour estime de soi Dove : Host
 2008–2010 : Dieu merci! : House comedian
 2008–2010 : Fan Club : Host
 2009 : Colocs.tv : Mélanie
 2010–2015 : 19-2 : Amélie de Granpré
 2012 : Tu m'aimes-tu ? : Mélanie
 2013 : Ces gars-là : Mélanie
 2014 : Mensonges : Julia Loman
 Depuis 2015 : Boomerang : Stéphanie Bernier
 2015 : Partir autrement : Host
 2016–2017 : District 31 : Nadine Legrand, lieutenant-detective (133 episodes)
 2017 : Plan B : Évelyne Lalonde (6 episodes)
 2018 : En audition avec Simon : Herself
 2018 : Letterkenny : Marie-Fred
 2019 : Appelle-moi si tu meurs : Crystel Simard
 Depuis 2021 : Sans rendez-vous : Sarah Lenoir
 2022 : The Night Logan Woke Up (La nuit où Laurier Gaudreault s'est réveillé) : Chantal Gladu

Web 

 Fourchette : Juliette

Distinctions

Awards 

 Prix Gémeaux 2018 : Best female lead drama series for Plan B
 Prix Artis 2018 : Female Personality of the Year
 Prix Artis 2018 : Best female role in an annual drama series for Nadine Legrand in District 31
 Prix Gémeaux 2011 : Best Youth Animation for Fan Club with Yan England

Nominations 

 Prix Gémeaux 2007 : Best youth animation for R-Force
 Prix Gémeaux 2008 : Best youth animation for R-Force with Marianne Moisan and Antoine Mongrain
 Prix Gémeaux 2009 : Best youth animation for Fan Club with Yan England
 Prix Artis 2010 : Youth Broadcasting Artist for Fan Club with Yan England
 Prix Gémeaux 2017 : Best female support role comedy for Boomerang
 Prix Gémeaux 2018 : Best Female Role in Annual Drama Series for District 31
 Prix Gémeaux 2018 : Best comedy performance for The SNL of Magalie Lépine-Blondeau
 Prix Gémeaux 2018 : Best animation for The SNL of Magalie Lépine-Blondeau
 Prix Gémeaux 2018 : Best Female Role in Seasonal Drama Series for Plan B
 Prix Gémeaux 2018: Best female support role: comedy for Boomerang

Notes and References

External links 

 
 Fiche télé on Qui Joue Qui?

1982 births
Living people
21st-century Canadian actresses
Canadian stage actresses
Canadian film actresses
Canadian television actresses
Actresses from Quebec
French Quebecers